Clarina syriaca is a moth of the family Sphingidae. *

Distribution 
It is found from northern Turkey south to northern and western Syria, Lebanon, northern Jordan and Israel. It is also present in central Cyprus. In southern Turkey this species appears to have spread farther west in recent years and can now be found up to Antalya. It is often treated as a subspecies of Clarina kotschyi.

It favours cultivated valley floors with boulder-strewn streams bordered by vine-covered trees and shrubs. It is also found on hillsides and in mountain valleys with shrubs and isolated trees, and in vineyards. In southern Turkey it is common in the valleys of the foothills of the Toros Mountains where they rise from the coastal plain. Villas and farmhouses with pergolas covered with grapevines are especially favoured.

Description 
The wingspan is 50–65 mm. It is variable in colour (some individuals are more tawny than others) and size. Males are paler than females. The forewing upperside bands and lines are distinct. The pattern is similar to that of Darapsa choerilus. There are two generations per year with adults on wing from May to early July and again in August and September.

Biology 
The larvae have been recorded feeding on Vitis and Parthenocissus species. It generally favours vines of Vitis vinifera hanging down walls, cliffs and from trees.

References

Macroglossini
Moths described in 1855